The bay owls (Phodilus) are a genus of Old World barn-owls. The defining characteristics of bay owls are their smaller bodies, in comparison to other barn owls, and their U- or V-shaped faces. These owls can be found in South to Southeast Asia within forest and grassland ecosystems.

Taxonomy and systematics
The genus Phodilus was erected by the French zoologist Isidore Geoffroy Saint-Hilaire in 1830. Some taxonomists place two species in the genus, while others include three. The name is from the Ancient Greek phōs for "light" or "daylight" and deilos for "timid" or "cowardly".
Most classification schemes recognize three extant species in this genus:

The Itombwe owl (T. prigoginei) was formerly classified in this genus as the Congo bay owl, but morphological evidence suggests that it is a member of the genus Tyto.

Description
Although bay owls are typically smaller, they bear resemblances to other barn owls. Other characteristics of the bay owl are groupings of feathers that resemble ears, and a divided face disk. Bay owls have also been attributed with U-or V-shaped faces. Their wings are rounded and their tail is chestnut-colored, with a few narrow, dark bars.  Their tarsi, or leg/foot bones, are relatively short and fully feathered to the joint. Their toes are yellowish-brown with pale claws. Their throat has a creamy color and their underparts are often a pale yellowish-brown, with speckles of blackish-brown coloring.

Distribution and habitat
The bay owl can be found in regions from India to Southeast Asia and Indonesia. It is uncertain where the ancestors of these avians lived as the phylogeny of all species of bay owls has not been analyzed. These owls can be found in both forests and grasslands, but are fairly scattered in their distribution. However, their primary habitat is within dense evergreen forests, where the owls may roost during the day in the opening of tree trunks or branches sheltered by palm tree leaves. They are often found roosting no more than 2 meters off the ground. They are most vulnerable in this state and not very alert.

References

Further reading
 
Bruce, M. D. (1999): Family Tytonidae (Barn-owls). In: del Hoyo, J.; Elliott, A. & Sargatal, J. (eds): Handbook of Birds of the World, Volume 5: Barn-owls to Hummingbirds: 34–75, plates 1–3. Lynx Edicions, Barcelona.

External links 

Tropics
Taxa named by Isidore Geoffroy Saint-Hilaire